Melissa "Missy" Erickson (born September 5, 1990) is a track cyclist from the United States. She represented her nation at the 2015 UCI Track Cycling World Championships.

Personal life
Erickson grew up in Alexandria, Minnesota.  In 2015, she was involved in a cycling accident and sustained heavy injuries. In 2017 she opened up to the Huffington Post about sexual abuse she experienced as a teenager.  She now lives in Pennsylvania.

Career results

2013
Los Angeles Grand Prix
1st Keirin
1st Team Sprint (with Tela Crane)
2nd Sprint
Challenge International sur piste
2nd Keirin
2nd Sprint
2014
Japan Track Cup 1
1st Sprint
2nd Keirin
Japan Track Cup 2
1st Sprint
3rd Keirin
1st Keirin, Keirin Revenge
1st Sprint, Champions of Sprint
Los Angeles Grand Prix
1st Keirin
2nd Sprint
2nd Keirin, Fastest Man on Wheels
2015
Marymoor Grand Prix
1st Keirin
1st Sprint
2016
1st Scratch Race, US Sprint GP

References

External links
 
 
 Missy Erickson at WorldCyclingLeague.com
 World Cycling League’s Missy Erickson: ‘Traumatic Accident Made Me Better’
 Cycling Champ Missy Erickson Opens Up About Sexual Abuse

1990 births
Living people
American female cyclists
21st-century American women